The CWA Tag Team Championship was a major professional wrestling tag team title defended in the Continental Wrestling Association. It lasted from 1988 through 1990, when it was abandoned and replaced with the United States Wrestling Association Tag Team Championship.

Title history

See also
Continental Wrestling Association
United States Wrestling Association
USWA Tag Team Championship

References

External links
CWA Tag team Championship

Continental Wrestling Association championships
Tag team wrestling championships